Brandon Thompson or Brandon Thomson may refer to:
Brandon Thompson (American football), American football player
Brandon Thompson, firefighter that died in the Charleston Sofa Super Store fire
Brandon Thompson, drummer in The Waiting (band)
Brandon Thomson, South African rugby union player